Santo Michael Gennaro (born July 3, 1951 in Manhattan, New York) is an American rock drummer, author, musician, public speaker and mentor. He has recorded and toured with many musical artists including Blackjack, The Monkees, Pat Travers, Cyndi Lauper and Joan Jett.

Early Years
Born "Santo Gennaro" in Little Italy, (Manhattan's Lower East Side), Gennaro grew up on Staten Island, New York. At the age of 3 he showed interest in a toy drum and later at age 13 he played a friend's snare drum, which prompted him to buy his first drum set. At age 14 he joined his first band "The Black and Blues". Gennaro took private lessons and by 16 he was touring the New York/New Jersey/Pennsylvania circuit, playing high school dances, parties and minor musical events. At 18, Gennaro toured the Midwest playing night clubs and bars in a Cover band. In 1976 Gennaro moved to California and joined rock quartet Blackjack, featuring Michael Bolton, guitarist Bruce Kulick and bassist Jimmy Haslip. Blackjack recorded two albums and toured with Peter Frampton which eventually led Gennaro to record his first hit single with the New York-based singer Benny Mardones, "Into the Night" and LP Never Run, Never Hide. This was the beginning of Gennaro's association with the Pat Travers Band and afterwards his connection with singer/songwriter Cyndi Lauper, whose debut album She's So Unusual became a multi-platinum hit. Lauper hired Gennaro for the Fun Tour as well as other national and international tours and he appears on the concert video for the singer's single "Money Changes Everything". From here Gennaro went on to record and tour with Bo Diddley, Joan Jett and Johnny Winter.

Recording Career
Gennaro's recording career includes Blackjack, Pat Travers, Cyndi Lauper, Robin Gibb, Craaft, Joan Jett, Junkyard Angels, and the Monkees.

Professional Expansion
Gennaro toured with Craaft, a metal band from Germany  throughout Europe/UK as the opening band for Queen during mid-1986. He participated on every The Monkees reunion tour from 1987 until the death of Davy Jones in 2012. Genarro was also the featured drummer on the 2nd and 3rd Annual Dick Wagner Memorial Concert in 2016 and 2017 respectively. 'Remember The Child" at The Fillmore Detroit commemorating the late guitarist/singer/songwriter Dick Wagner. Wagner's music which was performed by many artists including Wagner's son Robert Wagner, Jean Beauvoir, Grammy Award-winning pianist and singer from The Waterboys Paul Brown, guitarist Micki Free, Derek St. Holmes, Joe Bass, Hal Patino, Maryann Cotton, Jimmie "Bones" Trombly, guitarist Kenny Olson, Peter Keys, David Winans II, Muruga Booker, Dennis Dunaway, The Frost, Laurie Beebe Lewis Johnny "Bee" Badanjek and other supporting musicians. The 3rd annual "Remember the Child Concert" held in Detroit, Michigan at the MotorCity Casino Hotel in The Sound Board performance venue also featured Suzi Quatro Mark Farner, Kip Winger and many returning artists from the previous year. Proceeds benefited Children's Miracle Network Hospitals supporting music therapy.

Gennaro has served as a counselor and teacher at David Fishof's Rock 'n Roll Fantasy Camp since 2007 and continues to mentor musicians through this program. Gennaro taught at The Collective in New York City for 27 years where he created the Music Business program, teaching private lessons and master classes before moving to Nashville.

Author
Gennaro wrote several articles for Modern Drummer magazine. He is also the creator of "Drum Basics" and "Contemporary Rock Styles for the Drums." His writing is featured in the October 2016 issue of Drumhead Magazine (owned by Jonathan Mover) issue #057, page 70 "The Top 10 Straight 8th and 16th note Grooves Every Drummer Should know....And Why"  Sandy Gennaro's book "Beat The Odds"  was co written with Steve Olivas and released in May of 2022. The 219 page book addresses business management, the music industry and Sandy's personal life experience as a drummer and public speaker.

Discography
1979 Blackjack – Blackjack, Polydor PD-1-6215
1980 Blackjack - Worlds Apart, Polydor PD-1-6279
1980 Benny Mardones - Never Run Never Hide, Polydor PD 2391 449
1981 Pat Travers – Radio Active, Polydor PD 2391 499
1982 Pat Travers – Black Pearl, Polydor PD 2391 553
1984 Cyndi Lauper – "Money Changes Everything LIVE!" (single) Epic/Portrait 3P-582
1985 Cyndi Lauper – The Goonies (soundtrack)
1985 Robin Gibb – Walls Have Eyes, Polydor 827 592-1
1986 Craaft – Craaft Epic 26880
1990 Joan Jett – The Hit List, CBS Associated Records ZK 45473
1994 Junkyard Angels – Out of the Junkyard Onto the Curb, Midnight Fantasy Records 9839-2
2001 Micky Dolenz, Davy Jones, Peter Tork – 2001: Live in Las Vegas, Not On Label 772801
2002 The Monkees – Live Summer Tour (DVD), WIN Media – DVD-UK003d
2013 Pat Travers Band – Can Do, Back On Black Rock Classics RCV123LP

Compilation albums
1991 Pat Travers – The Best of Pat Travers, Polydor 849 374-2
2014 Cyndi Lauper – She's So Unusual (A 30th Anniversary Celebration), Portrait 88883706352
2015 Pat Travers – Feelin' Right - The Polydor Albums 1975-1984, Polydor 5352821

Personal life
On May 12, 1990, Gennaro married Shari Lynn Athey in North Carolina.
Gennaro currently lives in Nashville, Tennessee, where he continues to teach, write, record, perform and travel for music and speaking engagements.

References

External links
 Official web site
 Discogs
 Credits at Allmusic

Living people
People from Staten Island
American rock drummers
American people of Italian descent
American motivational speakers
Musicians from New York City
1951 births
20th-century American drummers
American male drummers
20th-century American male musicians